Krystal Sutherland (born 1990) is an Australian author. She is best known for her first novel, Our Chemical Hearts, and her third novel, House of Hollow, which is listed on the New York Times Best Seller list. She currently lives in London.

Biography 
Sutherland was born and raised in Townsville, Australia. She has lived in multiple big cities across the world; in Sydney, where she edited her university's student magazine; in Amsterdam, where she worked as a foreign correspondent; and Hong Kong, where she finished her degree.

While attending high school Sutherland wanted to be an actress. In 2016, she published her first novel, Our Chemical Hearts, which was made in a feature film in 2020 by Amazon Studios.

Film adaptations 

In 2020, Amazon Studios released a feature film of the novel Our Chemical Hearts, titled Chemical Hearts, starring Lili Reinhart and Austin Abrams. Her second novel, A Semi-Definitive List of Worst Nightmares, has been optioned for adaptation by Yellow Bird US.

Bibliography 
 Our Chemical Hearts (2016)
 A Semi-Definitive List of Worst Nightmares (2017)
 House of Hollow (2021)

References

External links 
 

Living people
21st-century English women writers
21st-century English novelists
English women novelists
People from Townsville
Writers from New South Wales
Australian emigrants to the United Kingdom
British writers of young adult literature
Women writers of young adult literature
1990 births